The Gaieties of the Squadron (French: Les gaîtés de l'escadron) is a 1913 French silent comedy film directed by Joseph Faivre and Maurice Tourneur and starring Edmond Duquesne, Henry Roussel and Henri Gouget. It is a military-based farce adapted from the popular play by Georges Courteline. Tourneur later remade it as a sound film Fun in the Barracks (1932).

Plot
The life of disorderly soldiers in the barracks dealing with daily routines.

Cast
 Edmond Duquesne as Capitaine Hurtulet  
 Henry Roussel as Le général  
 Henri Gouget as L'adjudant Flick  
 Pierre Delmonde
 Maurice de Féraudy 
 Charles Krauss 
 Fernande Petit 
 Polaire

References

Bibliography
 Waldman, Harry. Maurice Tourneur: The Life and Films. McFarland, 2001.

External links

1913 films
1913 comedy films
French comedy films
Films directed by Maurice Tourneur
French silent short films
Military humor in film
French black-and-white films
Silent comedy films
1910s French films